The canton of Decize is an administrative division of the Nièvre department, central France. Its borders were modified at the French canton reorganisation which came into effect in March 2015. Its seat is in Decize.

It consists of the following communes:
 
Champvert
Cossaye
Decize
Devay
Lamenay-sur-Loire
Lucenay-lès-Aix
Saint-Germain-Chassenay
Saint-Léger-des-Vignes
Verneuil

References

Cantons of Nièvre